John M. Hoiles (born 3 February 1961) is a former Australian rules footballer who played with Geelong in the Victorian Football League (VFL).

A Grovedale recruit, Hoiles made seven appearances for Geelong, two late in the 1985 VFL season and five in the 1986 season.

He is the son of John E. Hoiles, a former Footscray player.

References

1961 births
Australian rules footballers from Victoria (Australia)
Geelong Football Club players
Grovedale Football Club players
Living people